Marion Cannon (October 30, 1834 – August 27, 1920) was a United States representative from California.  He was born near Morgantown, Virginia (now in West Virginia) where he learned the blacksmith trade as a teenager and left home, carrying his blacksmith shop with him, from Mt. Morris, PA at the age of 18.  He loaded his business onto a Conestoga wagon pulled by two oxen named Buck and Berry and, instead of trying to cross the Sierras, headed west on the Oregon trail with a party led by Kit Carson as the wagon train's scout. Their wagon train arrived in Salt Lake City in time to witness the laying of the foundation stone for the Mormon Temple.

From Oregon, Cannon headed south to Nevada City, California, arriving sometime in 1852.  He set up shop there as a blacksmith and around 1860 married Lydia Jane Holland, built a home, and began raising a family of 5 children.  He served as Grand Master of the Nevada City Masonic Lodge and also one term (two years) as the county recorder for Omega County – which no longer exists. At some point he bought the Volcano gold mine, which he then sold in 1874 to purchase acreage in Ventura, California on Telephone Road to engage in agricultural pursuits.

November 20, 1890, Cannon was elected first State President of the Farmers’ Alliance and was reelected October 22, 1891. He helped to organize the People's Party of California and was elected as a Populist to the Fifty-third Congress (March 4, 1893 - March 3, 1895), but was not a candidate for renomination in 1894. He was chosen as a representative to the Supreme Council in Indianapolis in November 1891 and was selected by that body to represent California in the industrial conference at St. Louis February 22, 1892. He was delegate to the People's Party National Convention in 1892.

In Ventura he maintained his blacksmith shop business. He was listed as a blacksmith until the 1900 census. He also began farming, and ran in farming political and social circles.  He did not think much of the post Civil War east coast, and was an ardent booster of the West for the rest of his life.  He was a member of the California Grange, and, as a member of the Grange, was an ardent enemy of the railroads’ manipulation of costs for shipping produce. Marion Cannon was also a founding member of the Ventura Bank, which became the Bank of Italy, which later became the Bank of America.

After his stint in Congress, Cannon resumed agricultural pursuits until his death at Ranch Home, near Ventura, August 27, 1920. The Cannon family established a longstanding relationship with the Methodist church in Ventura. He was buried in Ivy Lawn Cemetery, Ventura, California.

References

1834 births
1920 deaths
Politicians from Morgantown, West Virginia
People's Party members of the United States House of Representatives from California
Burials at Ivy Lawn Cemetery
California Populists
Members of the United States House of Representatives from California